Paul Joseph "PJ" Crossan (born 9 October 1998) is a Scottish professional footballer who plays as a forward for Scottish League Two club Forfar Athletic. Crossan began his career with Dunfermline Athletic, before moving to Celtic in 2016. He also had spells with Alloa Athletic, Stranraer and Dumbarton.

Career
Crossan started his career with Yett Farm Boys Club and Fife Elite Football Academy, before signing with Dunfermline Athletic in 2014. Initially playing in the U20s squad, Crossan eventually progressed to the Pars first-team, making two substitutes in Scottish League One towards the end of the 2015–16 season. His first appearance came as a substitute in a 6–1 defeat of Stranraer, whilst his second came in Dunfermline's League One title winning match against Brechin City, coming on as an 89th minute-substitute and setting up a goal.

He signed for Celtic on 4 July 2016 for an undisclosed transfer fee. In August 2017, and after a year playing with Celtic's development side, Crossan was sent on loan to Scottish League One club Alloa Athletic, until January 2018. The loan was subsequently extended until the end of the season.

Crossan was loaned to Stranraer at the end of September 2018. After spending three years with Celtic, he was released by the club at the end of the 2018–19 season. He signed for Scottish League One club Dumbarton in July 2019 scoring six times in his first season with the club, before extending his stay in July 2020. He left the club after an injury plagued second season, joining Scottish League Two side Forfar Athletic.

Career statistics

References

External links

1998 births
Living people
Scottish footballers
Scottish Professional Football League players
Scotland youth international footballers
Dunfermline Athletic F.C. players
Celtic F.C. players
Alloa Athletic F.C. players
Stranraer F.C. players
Association football forwards
Dumbarton F.C. players
Forfar Athletic F.C. players